This is the discography of British folk and pop duo Peters and Lee.

Albums

Studio albums

Compilation albums

Singles

Notes

References

Discographies of British artists
Pop music group discographies
Folk music discographies